Bader Osama Majed Samreen (born 2 June 2000) is a Jordanian professional boxer.

Early life 
Bader Samreen was born on 2 June 2000 in Amman, Jordan. Samreen's brother, Hesham Samreen, is an amateur boxer who represented Jordan in the Tokyo Olympics qualifiers. Samreen is Muslim.

Amateur career 
During a podcast interview, Samreen revealed that he started boxing when he was 12 years old after his brother, Hesham Samreen, suggested it to him.

Samreen partook in the 2018 AIBA Youth World Boxing Championships representing his country Jordan in the lightweight division. Samreen managed to win a bronze metal after reaching third place while having an injured arm.

Professional career 
Samreen moved to Dubai once he made his professional as his country Jordan didn't have the facilities for professional boxing. Samreen made his professional debut on 12 March 2021 agaisnt Joshua Barnor, defeating him via technical knockout in the second round. 

Samreen fought Moaaz Allam on the Thor Björnsson vs Simon Vallily undercard on 28 May 2021 at the Concord Hotel in Dubai, UAE. Samreen defeated Allam via technical knockout in the first round. Samreen fought Fuad Tarverdi on the Oleksandr Usyk vs Anthony Joshua II undercard on 20 August 2022 at the Jeddah Superdome in Jeddah, Saudi Arabia. Samreen defeated Tarverdi via knockout in the first round. Samreen fought Viorel Simion on the Jake Paul vs Tommy Fury undercard on 26 February 2023 at the Diriyah Arena in Diriyah, Saudi Arabia. Samreen defeated Simion via techinical knockout in the first round.

Professional boxing record

References

External links

Living people
2000 births
Jordanian male athletes
Jordanian male boxers
Sportspeople from Amman
Lightweight boxers